Moffat View is a suburb of Johannesburg, South Africa. The area lies to the south of the Johannesburg CBD. It is located in Region F of the City of Johannesburg Metropolitan Municipality.

History
The suburb is named after John Abram Moffat, an architect. Moffat Park, in the nearby suburb called The Hill is named after him.

References

Johannesburg Region F